Andy Kessler Skatepark formerly Riverside Skatepark is a skatepark located in Riverside Park on the Upper West Side of Manhattan, New York City. Riverside Skatepark is notable as the first full-sized public skatepark in Manhattan, designed and built by renowned skateboarder and skatepark builder Andy Kessler.

Terrain
Andy Kessler Skatepark is a concrete skatepark built by California Skateparks consisting of a street plaza and a pool. It maintains a similar footprint as the original skatepark of approximately 30,000 square feet overall.The street plaza consists of stairs, ledges, rails, banks, bank to ledge and a 4 foot mini ramp.The pool is 11 foot deep in the deep end with 18" of vert, the shallow end is 6.5 feet deep. The pool has pool coping.

History
Built in 1995-1996, Riverside Skatepark was the first full-sized public skatepark in Manhattan. Andy Kessler headed up efforts to create Riverside Skatepark in collaboration with the New York City Parks Department and Riverside Parks Conservancy administrator Charles McKinney. The wooden park was built with the help of teenagers from Harlem and the Upper West Side. Riverside Skatepark opened in August 1996.

Preservation effort (2012-2018) 
In 2012 Riverside skatepark had fallen into disrepair and had low attendance, Ian Clarke of NYC Skateboard Coalition led an effort on two fronts to preserve the historic skatepark.

Repairs 
Ian Clarke led permitted repairs with the cooperation of Riverside Parks Conservancy and other skateboarders to repair and restore the historic ramps.

Events 
To bring attention to the neglected skatepark, Ian Clarke organized the annual Riverside Skate Jam event starting in 2013 with the cooperation of Riverside Parks Conservancy, help from other skateboarders and sponsorship from local skate shops and brands.

Concrete remodel (2019-2021) 
In June 2019, the New York City Department of Parks and Recreation broke ground on a concrete remodel of the Riverside Skatepark.

Renaming (2019-2021) 
In 2019 after the skatepark groundbreaking, NYC Skateboard Coalition petitioned local elected officials and community board 7 to rename the skatepark after Andy Kessler. In March 2020, the community board approved the renaming. In October 2021 the new signage went up.

Plaque (2022) 
In December 2022 New York City Department of Parks and Recreation installed a plaque at the skatepark to honor Andy Kessler.

Terrain 1996-2019
Riverside Skatepark, prior to the concrete remodel in 2019, was approximately 100 ft. by 300 ft. making it about 30,000 sq ft. Prior to the concrete remodeling, its main features were wooden ramps, the biggest being a vert ramp, 10 ft high by 28ft long, including a foot of vert. Other features included a 6 ft mini ramp, a micro mini ramp and a wall ride.

Events
The annual Riverside Skate Jam is held at the end of the season, typically September or October, featuring judged competitions with 1st, 2nd and 3rd prizes awarded for Juniors Micro Mini Ramp, Girls Micro Mini Ramp, Wall Ride, Vert Ramp under 40's and Vert Ramp Masters (40 and over).

References

Riverside Park (Manhattan)
Skateparks in New York City
Skateparks in the United States
Upper West Side